Pyroglutamyl-peptidase II (thyroliberinase, pyroglutamyl aminopeptidase II, thyrotropin-releasing factor pyroglutamate aminopeptidase, pyroglutamate aminopeptidase II, pyroglutamyl peptidase II, thyroliberin-hydrolyzing pyroglutamate aminopeptidase, thyrotropin-releasing hormone-degrading pyroglutamate aminopeptidase, thyrotropin-releasing hormone-degrading peptidase, TRH aminopeptidase) is an enzyme. This enzyme catalyses the following chemical reaction

 Release of the N-terminal pyroglutamyl group from pGlu--His-Xaa tripeptides and pGlu--His-Xaa-Gly tetrapeptides

This enzyme is highly specific for thyrotropin releasing hormone.

Human gene
TRHDE - thyrotropin releasing hormone degrading enzyme

References

External links 
 

EC 3.4.19